Maplestead may refer to:

Great Maplestead, a village in Essex
Little Maplestead, a village in Essex
Little Maplestead Preceptory, a friary in Essex